Nikolina Ćaćić (born 4 January 2001) is a Croatian boxer. She competed in the women's featherweight event at the 2020 Summer Olympics.

References

External links
 

2001 births
Living people
Croatian women boxers
Olympic boxers of Croatia
Boxers at the 2020 Summer Olympics
Sportspeople from Zagreb
Competitors at the 2022 Mediterranean Games
21st-century Croatian women
Mediterranean Games competitors for Croatia